Wayne Township is one of thirteen townships in Noble County, Indiana. As of the 2010 census, its population was 10,260 and it contained 4,554 housing units.

Geography
Sand Hill, the second highest named point in Indiana, is located in northeastern Wayne Township, near the intersection of county roads 1000E and 1100N.

Cities and towns
 Kendallville (north side)

Unincorporated towns
 Wakeville Village at 
 Wayne Center at 
(This list is based on USGS data and may include former settlements.)

Major highways
  U.S. Route 6
  Indiana State Road 3

Education
Wayne Township residents may obtain a free library card from the Kendallville Public Library in Kendallville.

References

External links
 Indiana Township Association
 United Township Association of Indiana

Townships in Noble County, Indiana
Townships in Indiana